Julianki  is a village in the administrative district of Gmina Parzęczew, within Zgierz County, Łódź Voivodeship, in central Poland.

The village has a population of 20.

References

Julianki